Arthur Aaron may refer to:

 Arthur Louis Aaron (1922–1943), English recipient of the Victoria Cross
 Arthur Aaron (footballer) (1885–?), English football player for Stockport County

See also
Arthur Aron (born 1945), American psychologist